Vlkovice is a municipality and village in Cheb District in the Karlovy Vary Region of the Czech Republic. It has about 100 inhabitants.

Administrative parts
The hamlet of Martinov is an administrative part of Vlkovice.

References

Villages in Cheb District